John C. Hertel was the Chairman of the Huron–Clinton Metroparks, Chairman of the Detroit Metro Convention & Visitors Bureau, and General Manager of Suburban Mobility Authority for Regional Transportation. He served three terms as State Senator for the 2nd District in Michigan from 1974 to 1982, was appointed by Governor John Engler to run the Michigan State Fair from 1993 to 2006, and is the only person in Michigan history to serve as chairman of the county boards of commissioners in two different counties (Wayne and Macomb).

Personal life

Hertel grew up in Detroit, MI, and attended Denby High School. His brothers Dennis Hertel and Curtis Hertel, and nephews Curtis Hertel Jr. and Kevin Hertel have also been elected to legislative seats. He raised his family in Harper Woods, MI, where he served in the State Senate and Wayne County Board of Commissioners, before moving to his current home in Lenox Township, MI where he served as Macomb County Commissioner. Hertel raises Percheron horses on his farm in Lenox Township.

Elected Office
Hertel has held three elected offices during his career:

 Macomb County Board of Commissioners (Chairman from 1997 to 2002)
 Wayne County Board of Commissioners (Chairman from 1985 to 1986)
 Michigan State Senator, 2nd District (1974–1982 - Three Terms)

Huron-Clinton Metroparks
Hertel was appointed as a Huron-Clinton Metroparks Commissioner five times:

 2013 by Governor Rick Snyder
 2005 and 2009 by Governor Jennifer Granholm
 1999 by Macomb County
 1995 by Governor John Engler
 1983 by Wayne County

Michigan State Fair
Hertel was appointed General Manager of the Michigan State Fair by Governor John Engler (R) and reappointed by Governor Jennifer Granholm (D) from 1993 to 2006. He inherited the fair after its lowest attendance in decades, and was credited by many including Governor Granholm for, "directing the rebirth of the State Fair."

Southeast Michigan Transit
Hertel was CEO of the Regional Transit Coordinating Council (RTCC) from 2006 to 2010, where he successfully developed and shepherded the Regional Mass Transit Plan to gain approval of Macomb, Oakland, Wayne counties and the City of Detroit.  In 2010, Hertel was hired as General Manager of the Suburban Mobility Authority for Regional Transportation (SMART).

Other notable positions
 Professor of Government, Environment and Technology at Lawrence Technological University, 1983–1995.
 Public Affairs Producer and Editorial Director of Channel 7 WXYZ-TV, 1987–1988.

References

External links 
 Metroparks Website
 SMART Website
 Detroit Metro Convention & Visitors Bureau Website

Politicians from Detroit
Living people
Wayne State University alumni
County commissioners in Michigan
Democratic Party Michigan state senators
1946 births
Denby High School alumni